Sigurd Kvile (born 26 February 2000) is a Norwegian professional footballer who plays as a centre-back for Kristiansund, on loan from FK Bodø/Glimt.

Career
Kvile moved FK Fyllingsdalen to SK Brann as a youth player, also moving on to Fana IL and briefly making his senior debut before joining the junior ranks of Sarpsborg 08. In the summer of 2020 he finally made his senior breakthrough as he joined Åsane, and he was picked up by reigning league champions FK Bodø/Glimt in 2021. He made his Eliteserien debut in May 2021 against Tromsø.

Career statistics

Club

Honours
Bodø/Glimt
Eliteserien: 2021

References

2000 births
Living people
Footballers from Bergen
Norwegian footballers
Association football fullbacks
Eliteserien players
Norwegian First Division players
Fana IL players
Åsane Fotball players
FK Bodø/Glimt players
Kristiansund BK players